After the Storm is a 1915 American short film directed by  B. Reeves Eason.

Cast
 Vivian Rich
 Harry von Meter (as Harry Van Meter)
 Walter Spencer
 Jack Richardson

References

External links

1915 films
1915 short films
American silent short films
American black-and-white films
Films directed by B. Reeves Eason
1910s American films